Sangolquí is a suburb of Quito and is the seat of Rumiñahui canton in the province of Pichincha, in northern Ecuador. It is connected to Quito by the Autopista General Rumiñahui (General Rumiñahui Highway).

The city is home to the prestigious university ESPE, one of the best universities in Ecuador. It is also home to Colegio Liceo del Valle, Colegio Antares, Liceo Naval Quito and "Émile Jaques-Dalcroze" High School, which offers International Baccalaureate and is an authorized centre for University of Cambridge ESOL Examinations. The city also holds the football club Independiente del Valle that reached the final of the 2016 Copa Libertadores, won the 2019 and the 2022 Copa Sudamericana.

Sangolquí, along with the rest of Rumiñahui canton, was designated as a Pueblo Mágico by the Ecuadorian Ministry of Tourism (MINTUR) in 2020.

References

Populated places in Pichincha Province
Rumiñahui Canton